Motretinide is an anti-acne preparation and aromatic analog of retinoic acid.

References

Anti-acne preparations